Maharam is an acronym of the words  (Morenu Ha-Rav rabi M..., Our teacher the Rabbi M...), a pattern also used for other names. Since many Rabbis were referred to as Maharam, an addition, usually a name of a place or a surname is generally used to differentiate between them.

Maharam may refer to

People
Dorothy Maharam (1917–2014), American mathematician behind Maharam's theorem
Meir Eisenstadt (Maharam Ash), Rabbi Meir EisenstadtPoland, Germany, c. 1670–1744
Meir Eisenstaedter (Maharam Ash, 1780–1852), Rabbi Meir Eisenstaedter (Hungary, 1780–1861)
Meir Lublin (Maharam Lublin, 1558–1616), Rabbi Meir Lublin
Meir of Rothenburg (Maharam of Rothenburg), Rabbi Meir of Rothenburg ob der Tauber
Meir Shapiro (Maharam Shapiro, 1887–1933), Rabbi Meir Yehuda Shapiro of Lublin, creator of the Daf Yomi
Meïr b. Jacob Schiff (Maharam Schiff), Rabbi Meïr b. Jacob Schiff
Mordecai Benet (Maharam Benet, 1753–1829), Rabbi Mordecai Benet (Moravia
Moses Alashkar (Maharam Alashkar, 1466–1542) -posek quoted extensively by R. Chaim Benbenishti
Moses Halevi Mintz (Maharam Mintz), Rabbi Moses Halevi Mintz (Germany, 1415–Poland, 1480)
Moshe Schick (Maharam Schick, 1807–1879), Hungarian rabbi

Other
 Maharam's theorem, a mathematical theorem regarding decomposability of measure spaces
 Maharam algebra